D-flat or D♭ may refer to:

 D-flat major
 D-flat minor
 The musical pitch D